Bogomazov (masculine) or Bogomazova (feminine) is a Russian surname. Notable people with the surname include:

Alexander Bogomazov (1880–1930), Ukrainian Soviet artist
Anna Bogomazova (born 1990), Russian kickboxer, martial artist and professional wrestler
Valentin Bogomazov (1943–2019), Russian diplomat, ambassador to Ecuador and Peru
Yelena Bogomazova (born 1982), Russian swimmer

Russian-language surnames